Ophiotaenia ranae is a tapeworm from Japan. It is parasite of the frog Rana nigromaculata.

References

Cestoda
Parasites of amphibians
Taxa named by Satyu Yamaguti